Ullaasam is a 1997 Indian Tamil-language romantic film directed and co-written by the duo J. D. and Jerry and produced by actor Amitabh Bachchan. The film featured Ajith Kumar, Vikram and Maheswari with Raghuvaran, S. P. Balasubrahmanyam and Srividya in other pivotal roles. Featuring music by Karthik Raja, the film was released on 23 May 1997.

Plot
The plot revolves around two fathers and their sons. JK, Dev's father, is a smuggler who lives in a house near by Thangaiah, father of Guru. In his childhood days, Guru was attracted by JK's activities and follows his footsteps. While Thangaiah tries to convince his son, it is all in vain. He became vexed and started to raise Dev (JK's son), as a good man. In their college days, Dev becomes a singer. With the "lover boy" image, he is really popular among the ladies in the college. While Guru studying in the same college becomes a dancer and turns out to be a local dada, who helps JK in his business. Both Guru and Dev fall in love with the same girl, Megha, who is in love with Guru.

Thangaiah realises Dev's love for her and begs Guru to leave his love for Dev, since he won't be able to lead a peaceful life in the shape he is. Despite Guru having thoughts of leaving Megha. Dev steps aside knowing that Megha is in love with Guru. As Dev hides his feelings for Megha. He wishes the both of them by saying, that the love they have for each other will prevail. The film ends with Guru's choosing to stay with the dark world and with Megha, by his side.

Cast

Production
The film became Amitabh Bachchan's first Tamil language film production under his banner, Amitabh Bachchan Corporation and as a result, he chose to select several leading actors for the project. Ajith Kumar signed on after the success of Kadhal Kottai (1996), whilst Maheswari, the cousin of actress Sridevi, was signed after enjoying success in Telugu films. The makers initially tried to cast Arun Vijay in a parallel lead role, but his reluctance to work on dual hero films meant that Vikram was signed. Moreover, the film boasted of a strong supporting cast of Raghuvaran, S. P. Balasubrahmanyam and Srividya, whilst Jeeva as cinematographer and Raju Sundaram as choreographer were also amongst the most prolific options in the Tamil film industry at their respective occupations. The director duo were signed on after Amitabh Bachchan Corporation Limited had been a part of the marketing team in some of the serial episodes they had directed. Abdullah, actress Khushbu's brother, and Roshini, actress Nagma's sister, were also reported to be a part of the initial cast but eventually did not feature.

Leading Tamil actor Kamal Haasan sung a song, "Muthe Muthamma" for the film under the composition of Karthik Raja. The film was briefly delayed due to the FEFSI production strikes of 1997. Furthermore, during production Ajith suffered due to the dancing and fighting involved which caused problems for his back, leading to a further round of corrective surgery.

Soundtrack 
The film's soundtrack was composed by Karthik Raja with actor Kamal Haasan also singing a song in the album. The lyrics were written by Gangai Amaran, Arivumathi, Palani Bharathi, Paarthi Bhaskar and Arunmozhi (Rap). The song "Cho Larey" was based on the 1977 Peruvian song "La Colegiala". The song "Veesum Kaatrukku" was well received upon release.

Release
A critic from Indolink said that "though boasting of impressive names in its credits, Ullaasam doesn't bring out the best in any of them". R. P. R. of Kalki called the film's screenplay as Pallavan bus which goes in a speed then faces sudden breakdown often. The film became a financial failure at the box office, and became one of the five consecutive failure films by Ajith in 1997. Post-release, Vikram acknowledged the film for expanding his female fan base as a result of the soft-personality of his character. Talking about the theatrical run of the film, the directors felt that "overkill" of the subject may have turned audiences away, and stated the youth-centric feel was similar to two earlier releases during the same period, Kadhal Desam (1996) and Minsaara Kanavu (1997).

Legacy
In October 2019, J.D. & Jerry expressed an interest in remaking the film with Vikram Prabhu in Ajith's role and Dulquer Salmaan in Vikram's role, with Pattukkottai Prabakar also working on an early draft for the new version.

References

External links

1997 films
1990s Tamil-language films
Indian romantic thriller films
1997 directorial debut films
1990s romantic thriller films
Films scored by Karthik Raja
Films directed by J. D.–Jerry